The Swadhin Bangla Biplobi Parishad (English: Free Bengal Revolutionary Council) was an armed underground student political group secretly organized in 1961 by Serajul Alam Khan, a key founder of Bangladesh, that worked to wage an armed secessionist struggle against Pakistani rule and achieve the independence of East Pakistan as "Bangladesh".

Swadhin Bangal Biplobi Parishad was secretly organized in Dhaka University's Jahrul Hoque Hall by Mujibur Rahman under command of Sirajul Alam Khan (who was from the same university) along with Abdur Razzak and Kazi Aref Ahmed. Its political arm was the Bangladesh Liberation Force (BLF). From 1962, it planned and organized mass movements through the historic 6-point and 11-point programs. Training of Dhaka University students for the armed revolt against Pakistan started on the university's gymnasium field on 1 March as the university's halls were closed to students since then.

Earlier, Mujibur Rahman had founded another student group in the same university's Fazlul Huq Hall on 4 January 1948 named the East Pakistan Chhatra League, renamed the Bangladesh Chhatra League upon the Bangladesh Liberation War and Bangladesh's subsequent independence. The students of this league were recruited into the Mukti Bahini (Liberation Army), Mujibur Rahman's armed guerrilla force and the military arm of his political party the Bangladesh Awami League trained by India's foreign intelligence organization the Research and Analysis Wing to wage the liberation struggle.

The BLF first made the flag of Bangladesh and hoisted it on 2 March 1971, when the Awami League, led by Mujibur Rahman, made a call for a general strike to agitate for independence. That strike saw violent pogroms against ethnic non-Bengalis residents in East Pakistan. In response to those killings and mass expulsions, the Pakistani military on 25 March launched Operation Searchlight. Mujibur Rahman declared East Pakistan's independence the following day. Subsequently, under Mujibur Rahman's directive, the BLF high command was reconstituted with Serajul Alam Khan, Sheikh Fazlul Huq Moni, Abdur Razzak and Tofail Ahmed. This revamped BLF was renamed "Mujib Bahini" (Mujib's Army) in the war.

The general strike, pogroms and the resulting war followed on the heels of the Agartala Conspiracy, at the time deemed a politically motivated accusation by the Pakistani state against Bengali leaders but confirmed in 2011 to be factually true by the Bangladeshi Parliament's Deputy Speaker and one of the Agartala conspirators Shawkat Ali. By the start of the war, other countries hostile to Pakistan seized upon the opportunity and gave material assistance to this student movement (that had by now morphed into an armed guerrilla revolt) to bring about Pakistan's disintegration, with a potentially friendly nation's independence being a favorable by-product. When the war ended the Indian Army destroyed all files and records of its activities regarding East Pakistan before as well as during the war, though in 2015 the Indian Prime Minister Narendra Modi would explain India's role in the war in an address at Dhaka University.

The central role of students in the armed secessionist rebellion aided by India was the main reason why the Razakars killed Bengali students and intellectuals on Dhaka University grounds on 25 March at the start of Operation Searchlight and committed another massacre of Bengali intellectuals on 14 December, two days before Pakistan's defeat and surrender and Bangladesh's resulting independence. Both massacres were committed on the grounds that Dhaka University was a hotbed of guerrilla activity and served as an arms dump and a nerve center of military operations run by the university's students and faculty.

After the end of the war, Mukti Bahini perpetrated hooliganism and looting, according to AK Khandokar. The Mukti Bahini also resumed its persecution against ethnic non-Bengalis in the newly independent country.

References

History of East Pakistan